Dublin, Wicklow and Wexford Railway (DW&WR) 24 was the lead engine of a class of five  tender locomotives built in two batches in 1864 and 1873.

History
The engines are attributed to the locomotive superintendent William Meikle and the first three, Nos. 24 (Glenamore), 25 (Gleanart) and No. 26 were supplied in 1864.  A further two, No. 32 (Glenmalure) and No. 33 (Glendalough) with detail differences followed in 1873.

These engines took over the main line express passenger trains to Wicklow and Wexford from earlier 2-4-0 types. They continued to work main line expresses until replaced by more powerful 4-4-0s in 1895.

No. 26 (Blackrock) was converted into a  locomotive in 1900 and served on the Shillelagh branch line thereafter.

No. 25 was Irish Civil War loss.  All were life expired by 1925 and withdrawn immediately on the amalgamation to Great Southern Railways apart from No. 24 which lasted until 1928 becoming GSR No. 422 and the sole member of class 422 / G7.

Notes and references

Notes

References

2-4-0 locomotives
5 ft 3 in gauge locomotives
Railway locomotives introduced in 1864
Scrapped locomotives
Steam locomotives of Ireland
Sharp Stewart locomotives